Mamin Sanyang (born 6 February, 2003) is a Gambian professional footballer who plays as a winger and wing-back for German club Bayern Munich II.

Early life
Sanyang was born in Brikama, The Gambia. His family moved to Germany as refugees in 2013 and settled in Baden-Württemberg. Then he joined the youth academy of local 2. Bundesliga club 1. FC Heidenheim. After three seasons there, he moved to the academy of Bundesliga club 1899 Hoffenheim.

Career
In June 2020, he signed for Bayern Munich at the age of seventeen, joining the under-19 squad. Sanyang signed a three-year contract with Bayern Munich. On July 16 2022, he made his debut for Bayern Munich II against VfB Eichstätt.

Style of play
Sanyang is said to operate on the right flank, able to operate both offensively and defensively. He has been described as a winger, but also a wing-back. It has been said that he could possess the “ the guile and creativity to play behind a central striker”.

International career
Sanyang is eligible to play for either Gambia or Germany. On September 6 2021, he represented Germany U19s against England U19s in a 1-1 draw. However, he later declared for Gambia. In February 2023, Sanyang was called up to the Gambia national under-20 football team for the 2023 Africa U-20 Cup of Nations tournament, held in Egypt in February and March 2023. He made his debut for Gambia U20s during the AFCON tournament against Zambia U20s.

References

External links

2003 births
Living people
Germany youth international footballers
German people of Gambian descent
Association football defenders
FC Bayern Munich II players
Gambian footballers
The Gambia youth international footballers
People from Brikama